"Wicked Game" is a 1990 song by Chris Isaak.

Wicked Game may also refer to:

 Wicked Game (Chris Isaak album), 1991 album by Chris Isaak
 Wicked Game (Il Divo album), sixth studio album by the operatic pop group, Il Divo
Wicked Game (film), 1989 Egyptian film

See also
 "Wicked Games", 2012 song by The Weeknd
 Wicked Games, a diptych comprising the films Rimini and Sparta directed by Ulrich Seidl